Guernsey's is an auction house founded by Arlan Ettinger and Barbara Mintz. It is based in New York City.

History
Guernsey's was founded by New York advertising executives Arlan Ettinger and Barbara Mintz in 1975. It specializes in collecting obscure items.

Notable Auctions
 Elvis Presley's first guitar
 Michael Jackson's moonwalking self-portrait
 Jerry Garcia's guitar called "Wolf"
Keith Haring's refrigerator

References

External links 

Auction houses based in New York City
American companies established in 1975
Retail companies established in 1975